The ABC 8 hp is an 8 hp (6 kW) two-cylinder aero engine designed by the noted British engineer Granville Bradshaw for use in ultralight aircraft. The engine was derived from a specially tuned motorcycle unit and was built by ABC Motors, first running in 1923.

Applications
English Electric Wren
Handley Page H.P.22
Pegna-Bonmartini Rondine

Survivors
The sole surviving English Electric Wren (G-EBNV) flies occasionally at the Shuttleworth Collection at Old Warden and is powered by an ABC 8 hp engine. With barely enough power to maintain flight the aircraft is assisted into the air by a team of volunteers using bungee cord, after which the Wren lands straight ahead following a short 'hop'.

Specifications (ABC 8 hp)

See also

References

Notes

Bibliography

 Guttery, T.E. The Shuttleworth Collection of historic aeroplanes, cars, cycles, carriages and fire engines. Biggleswade, Bedfordshire: The Collection, 1969. 
 Lumsden, Alec. British Piston Engines and their Aircraft. Marlborough, Wiltshire: Airlife Publishing, 2003. .

External links

1920s aircraft piston engines
8